Lake Garfield is a  lake located about  north of the center of Monterey, off Route 23 in Berkshire County, Massachusetts.

Overview
At the furthest western point of the lake near Tyringham Road, a public boat ramp and parking lot can be found. The town of Monterey makes these amenities unavailable during the period of June 15 through September 6 because of swimming season.
A 1979 survey recorded a total of 12 species of fish inside Lake Garfield: smallmouth bass, largemouth bass, pumpkinseed, yellow perch, chain pickerel, rainbow trout, golden shiner, brown bullhead, bluegill, white sucker, rock bass and white perch. Lake Garfield is a popular fishing site for rainbow trout during spring. Due to the dominant yellow and white perch population, gamefish are usually below average size and abundance although a good bass or pickerel may occasionally be produced by the lake.

Lake Garfield was named for a local family.

References

Reservoirs in Massachusetts
Lakes of Berkshire County, Massachusetts